Jennifer Digbeu (born 14 April 1987 in Lyon, France) is a French basketball player who has played 56 times for the French women's national basketball team since her debut against Turkey in 2008.  She was part of the French team that won the silver medal at the 2012 Summer Olympics.  Jennifer's brother Alain Digbeu is also a basketball player.

She currently plays for the ESB Villeneuve-d'Ascq team.

References

French women's basketball players
Sportspeople from Lyon
1987 births
Living people
Basketball players at the 2012 Summer Olympics
Olympic basketball players of France
Olympic medalists in basketball
Olympic silver medalists for France
Medalists at the 2012 Summer Olympics
Knights of the Ordre national du Mérite